Stephostethus is a genus of beetles in the family Latridiidae, containing the following species:

 Stephostethus altaicus (Reitter, 1902)
 Stephostethus alternans (Mannerheim, 1844)
 Stephostethus angusticollis (Gyllenhal, 1827)
 Stephostethus armatulus (Fall, 1899)
 Stephostethus arunus Sen Gupta, 1983
 Stephostethus attenuatus (Mannerheim, 1844)
 Stephostethus barunus Sen Gupta, 1983
 Stephostethus belonianus (Reitter, 1889)
 Stephostethus bilobatus Walkley, 1952
 Stephostethus breviclavus Fall, 1899
 Stephostethus carinatus Sen Gupta, 1976
 Stephostethus caucasicus (Mannerheim, 1844)
 Stephostethus chinensis (Reitter, 1877)
 Stephostethus cinnamopterus (Mannerheim, 1853)
 Stephostethus costicollis (Le Conte, 1855)
 Stephostethus curtulus (Mannerheim, 1853)
 Stephostethus indicus (Motschulsky, 1866)
 Stephostethus kashmirensis Sen Gupta, 1983
 Stephostethus lardarius (De Geer, 1775)
 Stephostethus liratus (Le Conte, 1863)
 Stephostethus malibicus Sen Gupta, 1983
 Stephostethus malinicus Sen Gupta, 1983
 Stephostethus minaticus Sen Gupta, 1983
 Stephostethus montanus Fall, 1899
 Stephostethus muticus Sharp, 1902
 Stephostethus nepalensis Sen Gupta, 1983
 Stephostethus nigratus Sen Gupta, 1976
 Stephostethus pandellei (C. Brisout de Barneville, 1863)
 Stephostethus paradoxus Sen Gupta, 1976
 Stephostethus productus (Rosenhauer, 1856)
 Stephostethus renukae Sen Gupta, 1983
 Stephostethus rufifrons Broun 1914
 Stephostethus rugicollis (Olivier, 1790)
 Stephostethus rybinskii (Reitter, 1894)
 Stephostethus setosus Rücker, 2004
 Stephostethus tarunus Sen Gupta, 1983
 Stephostethus variolosus (Mannerheim, 1844)

References

Latridiidae genera
Articles containing video clips